Nathalie Bizet (born 2 October 1966 in Beauvais) is a French Para-Equestrian Dressage rider. She won a bronze medal.

Career 
In 1982, at the age of 16, she began riding as an internship. Thereafter, she joined a club and began to ride regularly.

In 1988, she bought her first horse. Three years later, in 1991, she competed on the international circuit, and won a silver medal in compulsory test, at the World Championship.

At the 1996 Paralympic Games in Atlanta, she won a dressage team bronze medal. She competed in Mixed Dressage Grade IV finishing seventh, and in Mixed Kur Canter Grade IV  finishing ninth. The medal allowed her in 1997, to join the Athletes SNCF system as an administrative agent at Paris Rive Gauche.

At the 2000 Paralympic Games, she competed in Mixed Dressage - Championship Grade IV, and Mixed Dressage - Freestyle Grade IV.

At the 2004 Paralympic Games in Athens, she competed in Mixed Dressage - Championship Grade IV, and Mixed Dressage - Freestyle Grade IV.

At the 2008 Paralympic Games , she competed in Mixed Dressage - Freestyle Grade IV, and Mixed Dressage - Championship Grade IV.

At the 2012 Paralympic Games , she competed in Dressage - Freestyle Grade IV, Dressage - Championship Grade IV, and Dressage - Team.

In 2002, she finished eighth in the European championship, sixth and eighth respectively in compulsory dressage and free dressage. 

In 2005, she finished third in the European championship.

She also holds 26 French championship titles.

Nathalie has won more than 500 prizes, including around 80 victories among able-bodied riders.

References

External links 

 French rider Nathalie Bizet looks at the horse Exquis Onassis in the stable of the famous equestrian school "Le Cadre noir de Saumur"
 Dressage - Nathalie BIZET - EXQUIS ONASSIS - FRA - Grade IV

1966 births
Living people
Sportspeople from Beauvais
Paralympic equestrians of France
French female equestrians
Equestrians at the 1996 Summer Paralympics
Equestrians at the 2000 Summer Paralympics
Equestrians at the 2004 Summer Paralympics
Equestrians at the 2008 Summer Paralympics
Equestrians at the 2012 Summer Paralympics
Medalists at the 1996 Summer Paralympics
Paralympic bronze medalists for France